Juan Gutiérrez de Gualda (16th century) was a priest and mathematician known to be the author of a popular book on arithmetic.

Life and work 
Nothing is known about his life except he was the priest of Villarejo de Fuentes, province of Cuenca.

Gutiérrez is known by his book on arithmetic which was very successful in his times: Arte breve y muy provechoso de cuenta castellana y arismética (Toledo 1539). The book was reedited not less than five times in 16th century. It consist in a short arithmetic for merchants, very basic, which only contains forty pages and practically only explains the four rules and few more. The book is an example of the transition from roman numerals to arabic numerals because it resolves the problems with arabics (quenta arismetica), but it gives his expression in romans (quenta castellana). His success was in big part due to the fact that Juan de Yciar included it as an annex of his book on calligraphy from 1564.

References

Bibliography

External links 
 

16th-century Spanish mathematicians